Aire may refer to:

Music
Aire, a song on the album Chicago VII by the group Chicago (band), 1974
Aire (Yuri album), 1987
Aire (Pablo Ruiz album), 1997
Aire (Versión Día), an album by Jesse & Joy

Places 
Aire-sur-la-Lys, a town in the Pas-de-Calais département in France
Aire-la-Ville, a municipality in the Canton of Geneva, in Switzerland
Aire-sur-l'Adour, a town of Aquitaine, in the Landes département
Roman Catholic Diocese of Aire
Aire, Ardennes, a commune in the Ardennes département in France
Aïre, a small commune in Geneva, Switzerland
Illa de l'Aire, island in the Balearics

Rivers 
River Aire, a river in Yorkshire, England
Aire (Aisne), a river in the Ardennes département, northern France
Aire (Arve), a tributary of the Arve in the canton of Geneva, in Switzerland
Aire River (Victoria), a river in Australia

People  
Aire Koop (born 1957), Estonian actress
Aire Lepik, Estonian footballer

Other
Autoimmune regulator (AIRE), a human gene that is expressed in the thymus
Advice on Individual Rights in Europe (AIRE), a London based charity
Aire de service, a rest area/service station in France or in Quebec
The Siege of Aire (1710), a military action in the War of the Spanish Succession

See also
 Air (disambiguation)
 Airedale (disambiguation)
 Ayre (disambiguation)

Estonian feminine given names